Eduardo Ortiz Hernández (born 26 November 1963) is a Mexican lawyer and politician from the National Action Party. From 2006 to 2009 he served as Deputy of the LX Legislature of the Mexican Congress representing Sinaloa.

References

External links

1963 births
Living people
Politicians from Sinaloa
People from Culiacán
20th-century Mexican lawyers
National Action Party (Mexico) politicians
21st-century Mexican politicians
Deputies of the LX Legislature of Mexico
Members of the Chamber of Deputies (Mexico) for Sinaloa
21st-century Mexican lawyers